The 2021 Almaty Challenger II was a professional tennis tournament played on clay courts. It was the sixth edition of the tournament which was part of the 2021 ATP Challenger Tour. It took place in Almaty, Kazakhstan between 14 and 20 June 2021.

Singles main draw entrants

Seeds

 1 Rankings are as of 31 May 2021.

Other entrants
The following players received entry into the singles main draw as wildcards:
  Dostanbek Tashbulatov
  Denis Yevseyev
  Beibit Zhukayev

The following player received entry into the singles main draw as a special exempt:
  Timofey Skatov

The following players received entry from the qualifying draw:
  Jesper de Jong
  Ergi Kırkın
  Vladyslav Orlov
  Vitaliy Sachko

The following player received entry as a lucky loser:
  Filip Jianu

Champions

Singles

  Jesper de Jong def.  Marcelo Tomás Barrios Vera 6–1, 6–2.

Doubles

  Vladyslav Manafov /  Vitaliy Sachko def.  Corentin Denolly /  Adrián Menéndez Maceiras 6–1, 6–4.

References

Almaty Challenger II
2021 in Kazakhstani sport
June 2021 sports events in Asia